Schiphol Airport railway station is a major passenger railway station in Haarlemmermeer, Netherlands, beneath the terminal complex of Amsterdam Airport Schiphol, operated by the Nederlandse Spoorwegen. The station's six platforms are accessible via twelve escalators and three elevators located in the main concourse of the airport (Schiphol Plaza). The original station was opened in 1978, and the current station in 1995. It connects the airport to Amsterdam and other cities in the Netherlands, as well as to Belgium and France.

History

The original railway station at Schiphol was partly at street level and opened on 21 December 1978.

Initially passengers could only travel as far as Amsterdam's Zuid WTC and RAI stations, as well as south bound towards Leiden, The Hague and Rotterdam. For travel to Amsterdam Centraal station passenger had to travel to RAI and transfer to a local tram. A direct link was created with the construction of the Amsterdam-Schiphol railway in 1986.

A newly built underground station opened in 1995, the former building was demolished. As Amsterdam Airport Schiphol, which surrounds the railway station, is the largest airport within the Netherlands and the primary international gateway, Schiphol railway station changed into a major hub in the Dutch railway network.

The station was renamed Schiphol Airport on 13 December 2015 to make the station more recognizable to international travelers.

Destinations
Schiphol stations offers several trains per hour to Amsterdam Centraal, and frequent services to the rest of the country as well. These include intercity services to Leiden, The Hague, Rotterdam, Utrecht, Eindhoven, Amersfoort, Almere, Lelystad, Apeldoorn, Deventer, Enschede, Groningen, Leeuwarden, Nijmegen and Zwolle.

During nighttime, an hourly service connects Schiphol with Amsterdam, Utrecht, Rotterdam, Delft, Leiden and The Hague between 1am and 5am.

The Thalys, Intercity Direct and Intercity Brussels call at Schiphol railway station. These trains connect the airport to Rotterdam, Breda, Antwerp, Brussels Airport, Brussels and Paris.

Reservations are obligatory to board Thalys. For Intercity direct to Breda a supplement is required for the High Speed stretch to Rotterdam.

Train services

There are several types of train series in the Netherlands:
Intercity direct These are Intercity Services using the high speed network.
Intercity These are express trains calling at major stations. The fastest type of regular train in the Netherlands.
Sprinters These are trains calling at all stations and mostly are operated by SNG or SLT 'Sprinter' train sets.

The station is served by the following service(s):

National trains: ( timetable 2018 )
2× per hour High speed services (Intercity Direct) Amsterdam - Schiphol - Rotterdam
2× per hour High speed services (Intercity Direct) Amsterdam - Schiphol - Rotterdam - Breda
1× per hour Intercity service The Hague - Leiden - Schiphol - Duivendrecht - Lelystad - Zwolle - Groningen
1× per hour Intercity service The Hague - Leiden - Schiphol - Duivendrecht - Lelystad - Zwolle - Leeuwarden
1× per hour Intercity service Schiphol - Amsterdam Zuid - Duivendrecht - Amersfoort - Apeldoorn - Deventer - Almelo - Hengelo - Enschede
2× per hour Intercity service Schiphol - Amsterdam Zuid - Amsterdam Bijlmer Arena - Utrecht - Arnhem - Nijmegen
2× per hour Intercity service Schiphol - Amsterdam Zuid - Amsterdam Bijlmer Arena - Utrecht - 's-Hertogenbosch - Eindhoven - Venlo
1× per hour Intercity service Schiphol - Amsterdam Zuid - Duivendrecht - Hilversum - Amersfoort Schothorst
2× per hour Intercity service Lelystad - Almere - Amsterdam Zuid - Schiphol - The Hague - Rotterdam - Dordrecht
1× per hour Intercity Night train (nachtnet) service Rotterdam - Delft - The Hague - Leiden - Schiphol - Amsterdam Centraal - (Amsterdam Bijlmer Arena) - Utrecht
2× per hour local Sprinter service Hoofddorp - Schiphol - Amsterdam Sloterdijk - Amsterdam Centraal - Hilversum - Amersfoort Vathorst
2× per hour local Sprinter service Hoofddorp - Schiphol - Amsterdam Zuid - Duivendrecht - Weesp - Almere Oostvaarders
2× per hour local Sprinter service Hoofddorp - Schiphol - Amsterdam Zuid - Duivendrecht - Weesp - Hilversum - Utrecht
2× per hour local Sprinter service The Hague - Leiden - Hoofddorp - Schiphol - Amsterdam Sloterdijk - Zaandam - Hoorn Kersenboogerd
2× per hour local Sprinter service The Hague - Leiden - Hoofddorp - Schiphol - Amsterdam Sloterdijk - Amsterdam Centraal - (Zwolle)

International trains:
 13× per day High speed services (Thalys) Amsterdam - Schiphol - Rotterdam - Antwerp - Brussels - Paris
 1x per week High speed services (Thalys) Amsterdam - Schiphol - Rotterdam - Antwerp - Brussels - Chambéry - Albertville - Moutiers Salins - Aime la Plagne - Landry - Bourg St. Maurice (21 dec - 21 mar only)
 1x per week High speed services (Thalys) Amsterdam - Schiphol - Rotterdam - Antwerp - Brussels - Valence TGV	- Avignon TGV - Aix-en-Provence TGV - Marseille St. Charles (29 jun - 31 aug only)
 13x per day High speed services (Intercity Brussel) Amsterdam - Schiphol - Rotterdam - Breda - Antwerp - Brussels

Bus services

The following bus services depart from the bus platform outside the airport building. Italics indicates stops within the Schiphol area. All services are daily unless otherwise stated.

Timetable of 2019:

 69   Schiphol - Schiphol P40 - Sloten - Osdorp - Geuzenveld - Amsterdam Sloterdijk
 180 Circular line P30 - Schiphol - P40 - Schiphol Knooppunt Noord - Schiphol Oost - Schiphol Rijk - P30
181 Circular line Knooppunt Noord - P40 - Schiphol - P30 - Schiphol Rijk - Schiphol Oost - Schiphol Knooppunt Noord
185 Schiphol plaza - Justice Complex
 186 Schiphol P30 - Schiphol - Schiphol P40 - Schiphol Knooppunt Noord - KLM Headoffice - Amstelveen Busstation
 190 Schiphol P30 - Schiphol - Schiphol P40 - Schiphol Knooppunt Noord (also night service as N90)
 191 Schiphol Knooppunt Noord - Schiphol P40 - Schiphol - Schiphol P30 - Schiphol Zuidoost (Anchoragelaan)
 194 Schiphol P30 - Schiphol - Schiphol P40 - Schiphol Knooppunt Noord - Badhoevedorp - Osdorp De Aker
195 Schiphol P30 - Schiphol - Schiphol P40 - Schiphol Knooppunt Noord - Badhoevedorp - Slotervaart - Amsterdam Lelylaan (also night service as N95)
199 Schiphol P30 - Schiphol - Schiphol P40 - Schiphol Oost - Amstelveen Westwijk - Amstelveen Middenhoven
 287 Schiphol - Schiphol Rijk (Peak hours only)
 300 Haarlem - Hoofddorp - Schiphol - Schiphol Knooppunt Noord - Amstelveen - Ouderkerk a/d Amstel - Amsterdam Bijlmer ArenA (also night service as line N30)
 341 Hoofddorp - De Hoek - Schiphol - Schiphol Knooppunt Noord - Amsterdam Amstelveenseweg - VU Hospital - Amsterdam Zuid
342 Schiphol Knooppunt Noord - Schiphol - Schiphol Rijk - Aalsmeer - Uithoorn (also night service as N42)
 361 Schiphol - De Hoek - Nieuw Vennep - Lisse - Sassenheim
 365 Schiphol - Roelofarendsveen - Leiderdorp - Leiden
397 Nieuw-Vennep - Hoofddorp - Schiphol - Schiphol P40 - Schiphol Knooppunt Noord - Amsterdam Amstelveenseweg - Amsterdam Leidseplein (City Centre) - Amsterdam Elandsgracht (also night service as line N97)
 470 Schiphol - De Hoek - Leimuiden - Alphen a/d Rijn (also night service as line 870)
 870 Schiphol - De Hoek - Leimuiden - Alphen a/d Rijn (Nightbus)
 858 Schiphol - Keukenhof (March–May, only when Keukenhof is open)
N30 (Ijmuiden) - Haarlem - Hoofddorp - Schiphol - Amstelveen - Ouderkerk a/d Amstel - Amsterdam Bijlmer ArenA
N42 Schiphol Knooppunt Noord - Schiphol - Schiphol Rijk - Aalsmeer - Uithoorn
N90 Schiphol P30 - Schiphol - Schiphol P40 - Schiphol Knooppunt Noord
N95 Schiphol P30 - Schiphol - Schiphol P40 - Schiphol Knooppunt Noord - Badhoevedorp - Amsterdam Sloten
N97 Nieuw-Vennep - Hoofddorp - Schiphol - Schiphol P40 - Amsterdam Amstelveenseweg - Amsterdam Leidseplein (City Centre) - Amsterdam Elandsgracht - Amsterdam Centraal (Central station)

"Schiphol" is the main bus stop in front of the terminal building.

Lines 180–199, 300,341,342,397 and nightlines N30,N42,N90,N95,N97 are operated by "Connexxion"

Lines 361,365,470,858 and nightline 870 are operated by "Arriva"

Line 69 is operated by the "GVB" (public transport operator of the city Amsterdam)

Other facilities

Travelers have access to Schiphol Plaza, the airport's landside shopping centre, accessible to both air travelers and local customers. In addition to several smaller stores, Schiphol Plaza also contains two medium-sized supermarkets, Food Village and Albert Heijn. These supermarkets are open until midnight seven days a week. Soft-drink and snack machines are available on the platforms, as in most Dutch train stations.

References

NS website
Dutch Public Transport journey planner
Connexxion website
Connexxion Schiphol Area Network Map 
GVB Amsterdam website
Arriva website

External links
 
 Public transport at Amsterdam Airport Schiphol
 Schiphol Station services in Dutch

Railway stations in North Holland
Railway stations opened in 1978
Railway stations on the Schiphollijn
Railway stations located underground in the Netherlands
Airport railway stations
Haarlemmermeer
1978 establishments in the Netherlands
Railway stations in the Netherlands opened in the 20th century